Mr. Tourism International is a male beauty pageant realized annual in Panama. The competition gathers more than fifteen contestants around the world searching for one reason: the title of Mister Tourism International. The contest started in 2001 but failed between 2002 until 2010, backing with a new franchise. The current titleholder is José Alfredo Galarza from Puerto Rico.

Winners

Winners by country

Country not able to compete

Winners by Continent

Ranking

References

External links 
 Mr. Tourism International page in Pageantopolis

Male beauty pageants